Cloverdale is an unincorporated community located in the town of Necedah, Juneau County, Wisconsin, United States.

History
A post office called Cloverdale was established in 1912, and remained in operation until it was discontinued in 1947. The name Cloverdale is descriptive.

Notes

Unincorporated communities in Juneau County, Wisconsin
Unincorporated communities in Wisconsin